Lo Ho Gayi Pooja Iss Ghar Ki is an Indian television series which aired on SAB TV 30 June 2008 and ended on 12 March 2009. Lo Ho Gayi Pooja Iss Ghar Ki's plot revolves around Sana Saeed's character, who leaves Bhatinda to move to Mumbai to pursue a career in music.

Cast
 Sana Saeed as Pooja
 Amit Dolawat as Aman
 Hiba Nawab
 Rohini Hattangadi as hanti Devi
 Tanaaz Irani as Titli Bua
 Rajesh Balwani as Hansmukh Lal
 Silky Khanna as Manorama
 Jiten Lalwani as Amrit Lal
 Rajlakshmi as Kamini
 Abbas Khan as Chironji Lal
 Bhaktiyaar Irani as Shiv Raj Khosla 
 Mushtaq Khan as Subramanium Muthu Swami

References

Sony SAB original programming
Indian comedy television series
Indian drama television series
2008 Indian television series debuts
2009 Indian television series endings